The A38 is a major trunk road running from the south-east of Bodmin in Cornwall to Mansfield in Nottinghamshire. At , it is the longest 'A' road entirely within England.

Cornwall

 Bodmin
 Two Waters Foot (near Trago Mills)
 Doublebois
 Dobwalls
 The road bypasses Liskeard
 Trerulefoot
 Tideford
 Landrake
 The road bypasses Saltash
 Saltash Tunnel
 Tamar Bridge

Devon

 The road bypasses Plymouth
 Plympton
 Ivybridge
 South Brent
 Dean Prior
 Buckfastleigh
 Ashburton
 Chudleigh
 Kennford
 The A38 is concurrent with the M5 motorway south of Exeter before re-emerging at Junction 27 of the M5 at Sampford Peverell

Somerset

 Wellington - Town is technically bypassed but developments now reach the edge of the A38.
 Taunton
 North Petherton
 Bridgwater
Pawlett
Huntspill
 Highbridge
 Lower Weare
Churchill
Redhill

Bristol
 Bedminster
 The road passes through Bristol city centre
 Stokes Croft
 Bishopston
 Horfield

Gloucestershire
 Filton
Patchway
 Almondsbury
 Alveston
Falfield
Cambridge
 Whitminster
 Hardwicke
 Quedgeley
 The road passes around Gloucester city centre
 Coombe Hill
 Tewkesbury

Worcestershire
 Severn Stoke
 Kempsey
 The road passes through Worcester city centre
 Droitwich Spa
 Wychbold
 Bromsgrove

The West Midlands
 Lydiate Ash
 Rubery
 Longbridge
 Northfield
 Selly Oak
 Bournbrook
 Edgbaston
 The road passes through Birmingham City Centre
 Aston
 Castle Vale
 The road bypasses Sutton Coldfield

Staffordshire
 The road bypasses Lichfield
 Alrewas
 Fradley
 Barton under Needwood
 The road bypasses Burton on Trent

Derbyshire

 Mickleover
 Derby
 Allestree
 Little Eaton
 The road bypasses Belper
 The road bypasses Ripley
 The road bypasses Alfreton

Nottinghamshire
 Sutton in Ashfield
 Mansfield

References

Roads in England
Avon (county)
England-related lists
England geography-related lists
Road transport-related lists
Transport in Birmingham, West Midlands
Transport in Cornwall
Transport in Derbyshire
Transport in Devon
Transport in Gloucestershire
Transport in Nottinghamshire
Transport in Somerset
Transport in Staffordshire
Transport in the West Midlands (county)
Transport in Worcestershire
Streets in Birmingham, West Midlands